This is a list of Spanish football transfers for the summer sale in the 2009–10 season of La Liga and Segunda División. Only moves from La Liga and Segunda División are listed.

The summer transfer window opened on 1 July 2009, although a few transfers took place prior to that date. The window closed at midnight on 31 August 2009.  Players without a club could have joined one at any time, either during or in between transfer windows. Clubs below La Liga level could also have signed players on loan at any time. If need be, clubs could have signed a goalkeeper on an emergency loan, if all others were unavailable.

Summer 2009 transfer window

See also
List of Spanish football transfers winter 2009–10

References

Spanish football transfers Summer 2009
2009
2009
Trans
2009